Branch was the first seat of Branch County, Michigan.  It was platted in 1831.  The seat was moved to a different location in 1840 and the village then died out.

Sources

Populated places established in 1831
Former populated places in Michigan
Former populated places in Branch County, Michigan